William Robinson (January 26, 1693 – September 19, 1751) was a deputy governor of the Colony of Rhode Island and Providence Plantations.

Early life
Robinson was born in on January 26, 1693, in South Kingstown in the Rhode Island colony.  He was the eighth of twelve children born to Mary (née Allen) Robinson (1656–1705) and Rowland Robinson (1654–1716), who married in 1676 and acquired a fortune and considerable land holdings.

His mother was a granddaughter of Governor Henry Bull and his father, a deputy to the general assembly, was a relatively late immigrant to Rhode Island, arriving in Newport from Cumberland, England in 1675.  His maternal grandparents were John Allen, a wealthy farmer, and Elizabeth (née Brown) Allen.

Career
Robinson was one of the most prominent men in the colony for many years. He first served in a civil capacity in 1724, becoming Deputy to the General Assembly from South Kingstown, and subsequently served an additional eight terms.  In 1735, and again in 1741, he was the Speaker of the House of Deputies.  In 1742 he was appointed by the Assembly with four others to determine if the "woods" part of Newport, consisting mostly of farmers, should be set apart from the "compact" part of Newport, consisting mostly of merchants and tradesmen.  The following year the "woods" part became the new town of Middletown.

In 1745, Robinson was selected as Deputy Governor of the colony for a one year term, and then selected again in 1747 for another term, serving under Governor Gideon Wanton both times.

Personal life
Robinson married twice, had thirteen children, and resided at South Kingstown. His first marriage was in 1717 to Martha Potter (1692–1725), the daughter of John and Sarah (née Wilson) Potter. Together, William and Martha were the parents of five children, including:

 Rowland Robinson (1720–1806), who married Anstis Gardiner (1721–1773) in 1741.
 John Robinson (1721–1739), who died unmarried.
 Margaret Robinson (1722–1768), who married William Mumford in 1745.
 Elizabeth Robinson (1724–1804), who married Thomas Hazard in 1742 and was the grandmother of Rowland G. Hazard.
 Martha Robinson (1725–1768), who married Latham Clarke in 1747.

Following Martha's death in 1725, he married Abigail (née Gardiner) Hazard (1700–1772) in March 1727 in Kings County (now known as Washington County, Rhode Island).  Abigail was the widow of Caleb Hazard and the daughter of William and Abigail (née Remington) Gardiner.  This marriage resulted in eight more children, including:

 Christopher Robinson (1727–1807), who married Rhuhama Champlin in 1752.
 William Robinson (1729–1785), who married Hannah Brown in 1752.  Their daughter, Hannah Robinson married Lt. Gov. George Brown in 1776.
 Thomas Robinson (1731–1815), who married Sarah Richardson in 1752.
 Abigail Robinson (1732–1754), who married John Wanton in 1751.
 Sylvester Robinson (1735–1809), who married Alice Perry (1736–1787) in 1756 and became a freeman.
 Mary Robinson (1736–1776), who married John Dockray in 1756.
 James Robinson (b. 1738), who married Nancy Rodman.
 John Robinson (1742–1801), who married Sarah Peckham in 1761.

Robinson died on September 19, 1751, in South Kingstown, leaving a very large estate to his heirs, valued at over 21,000 pounds.  He is buried in a Robinson family cemetery near Narragansett Pier. His widow Abigail died on May 22, 1772.

See also

 List of lieutenant governors of Rhode Island
 List of colonial governors of Rhode Island
 Colony of Rhode Island and Providence Plantations

References

External links
 
State list of lieutenant governors of Rhode Island

1693 births
1751 deaths
People from South Kingstown, Rhode Island
People of colonial Rhode Island
Burials in Rhode Island